Herbert Hoover (1874–1964) was an American politician who served as the 31st president of the United States from 1929 to 1933.

Herbert Hoover may also refer to:
Herbert Hoover Jr. (1903–1969), Herbert Hoover's son and an engineer, businessman, and politician
M. Herbert Hoover (died 1952), Ohio politician
Herb Hoover (1912–1952), American test pilot

See also
SS President Hoover, an American ocean liner
Hoover High School, high schools named after Herbert Hoover